Marcus Butler (born 15 May 2002) is a Virgin Islander footballer who plays as a forward for the British Virgin Islands national football team.

Career

International career
Butler made his senior international debut on 14 November 2019, coming on as a half-time substitute for Trevor Peters in a 3–0 away defeat to the Bahamas during the CONCACAF Nations League.

Career statistics

International

References

External links

2002 births
Living people
British Virgin Islands footballers
British Virgin Islands international footballers
Association football forwards